The Last Hour (Spanish: La hora final) is a 2017 Peruvian thriller drama film written and directed by Eduardo Mendoza de Echave. It stars Pietro Sibille & Nidia Bermejo. It is based on real events and set at the beginning of the 1990s, a time of terrorism in Peru, specifically during Operation Victoria, which led to the capture of the terrorist leader Abimael Guzmán.

Synopsis 
Narrates the investigation process carried out by the Grupo Especial de Inteligencia del Perú (GEIN) to catch the leader of Shining Path. A close relationship between agents Carlos Zambrano and Gabriela Coronado, characters who carry frustrations and who try to hide their fears with their police work.

Cast 
The actors participating in this film are:

 Pietro Sibille as Carlos Zambrano
 Nidia Bermejo as Gabriela Coronado
 Toño Vega as Bernales
 Carlos Mesta as General Vidales
 Tommy Párraga as Fidel Coronado
 Fausto Molina as Gonzalo Zambrano
 Katerina D'Onofrio as Cecilia
 Haysen Percovich as "El Negro"
 Emilram Cossio as "Químico"
 Tony Dulzaides as Pablo Pérez
 Iván Chávez as José
 Miguel Vargas as Abimael Guzmán Reinoso
 Vanessa Vizcarra as Elena Iparraguirre
 Alejandra Saba as Maritza Garrido-Lecca
 Sandro Calderón as Luis Alberto "Sotil" Arana Franco
 Diego Seminario as Inchaustegui
 Herbert Corimanya as Valencia
 Renato Rueda as "Chupito"
 Alberick García as member of Grupo Colina
 Francois Macedo as member of Grupo Colina
 Christian Pacora as member of Grupo Colina
 Omar Estrada as "Pelé"
 Paul Beretta as Carrillo
 Fernando Pasco as Zambrano house owner
 Gustavo Mayer as Alfredo
 Melissa Giorgio as Paloma
 Roberto Ruiz as Gutiérrez
 Fernando Colichón as Squirrel
 Sarahi Poma as Seagull

Production 
The creation of the film was announced by Eduardo Mendoza de Echave himself in 2015 as a project to revalue the events of the era of terrorism. Between January and February 2017, principal photography began, where Mendoza repeated that the main objective of the film was to reach young audiences.

Release 
The Last Hour was initially scheduled to be released on September 12, 2017, the date on which in 1992 it was captured in a house on what is now Calle Varsovia in the Los Sauces urbanization of the Surquillo district in Lima during Operation Victoria, but its premiere moved to September 14 for unknown reasons. After its theatrical release, on June 15, 2018 it was released internationally on Netflix.

Reception 
The Last Hour was seen by 13,000 viewers on its first day increasing to 25,500 on its second day. By the end of its opening weekend, the film drew 70,000 viewers. In its seventh week in theaters, the film drew 224,732 viewers.

References

External links 

 

2017 films
2017 thriller drama films
Peruvian thriller drama films
La Soga Producciones films
2010s Spanish-language films
2010s Peruvian films
Films set in Peru
Films shot in Peru
Films set in the 1990s
Films about terrorism